Grey River may refer to:

Grey River (New Zealand), a major river in the west of New Zealand's South Island.
Grey River (Victoria), Australia
Grey River, Newfoundland and Labrador, Canada
Grey River (Chile)

See also 

 Little Grey River, a tributary of the Grey River, in New Zealand
 Gray River, Fiordland, New Zealand
 Greys River, a tributary of the Snake River, in the United States